Paddy is a brand of blended Irish whiskey produced by Irish Distillers, at the Midleton distillery in County Cork, on behalf of Sazerac, a privately held American company. Irish Distillers owned the brand until its sale to Sazerac in 2016. As of 2016, Paddy is the fourth largest-selling Irish whiskey in the World.

History

The Cork Distilleries Company was founded in 1867 to merge four existing distilleries in Cork city (the North Mall, the Green, Watercourse Road, and Daly's) under the control of one group. A fifth distillery, the Midleton distillery, joined the group soon after in 1868.

In 1882, the company hired a young Corkman called Paddy Flaherty as a salesman. Flaherty travelled the pubs of Cork marketing the company's unwieldy named "Cork Distilleries Company Old Irish Whiskey". His sales techniques (which included free rounds of drinks for customers) were so good, that when publicans ran low on stock they would write to the distillery to reorder cases of "Paddy Flaherty's whiskey". In 1912, with his name having become synonymous with the whiskey, the distillery officially renamed the whiskey Paddy Irish Whiskey in his honour.

In the 1920s and 1930s in Ireland, whiskey was sold in casks from the distillery to wholesalers, who would in turn sell it on to publicans. To prevent fluctuations in quality due to middlemen diluting their casks, Cork Distilleries Company decided to bottle their own whiskey known as Paddy, becoming one of the first to do so.

Present Day
In 1988, following an unsolicited takeover offer by Grand Metropolitan, Irish Distillers approached Pernod Ricard and subsequently became a subsidiary of the French drinks conglomerate, following a friendly takeover bid.

In 2016, Pernod Ricard sold the Paddy brand to Sazerac, a privately held American firm for an undisclosed fee. Pernod Ricard stated that the sale was in order to "simplify" their portfolio, and allow for more targeted investment in their other Irish whiskey brands, such as Jameson and Powers.

At the time of the sale, Paddy was the fourth largest-selling Irish whiskey brand in the world, with sales of 200,000 9-litre cases per annum, across 28 countries worldwide.

In 2020, Paddy's was named the Best Blended Irish Whiskey at the International Whiskey Competition. The whiskey also earned a silver medal and second place for Best Irish Whiskey at the event.

Blend
Paddy whiskey is distilled three times and matured in oak casks for up to seven years. Compared with other Irish whiskeys, Paddy has a comparatively low pot still content and a high malt content in its blend.

Jim Murray, author of the Whiskey bible, has rated Paddy as "one of the softest of all Ireland's whiskeys".

References

External links
Paddy Old Irish Whiskey website
Irish Distillers on Paddy

Irish whiskey
Pernod Ricard brands